Cealia Pompeius Pulchellus was, according to the notoriously unreliable Historia Augusta, a clergy member in the  Temple of Venus from 185 to 88. It was noted that Cealia was thought to be blessed by Cupid based on his very feminine appearance and body. At the age of 18, Cealia was supposedly summoned by Emperor Commodus to his bedchamber after the latter heard word of Cealia's rumored connection with the god of affection Cupid, only to be raped and murdered by the emperor the same night.

References 

2nd-century Romans
Ancient Roman religion